A Lady of Quality is a novel published in 1896 by Frances Hodgson Burnett that was the second highest best-selling book in the United States in 1896.  It was the first of series of successful historical novels by Burnett.

In addition to a play version of the novel, which debuted in 1897 featuring Julia Arthur, silent-film adaptations were released in 1913 and 1924.

References

External links
 A Lady of Quality full text at Project Gutenberg
 A Lady of Quality full scan (1899 print) via Google Books
 

 (1913 version)
 (1924 version)

1896 British novels
1896 American novels
Historical novels
Novels by Frances Hodgson Burnett
British novels adapted into films
American novels adapted into films